Vinko Cuzzi (11 July 1940 – 8 December 2011) was a Croatian footballer who played as right back or libero.

Playing career

Club
Cuzzi was the Hajduk Split squad captain for several years, receiving the trophy when Hajduk won the 1967 Yugoslav Cup, which was also their first triumph in that competition.

International
He made his debut for Yugoslavia in a September 1965 friendly match away against the Soviet Union and earned a total of 8 caps, scoring no goals. His final international was a June 1966 friendly away against West Germany.

Post-playing career
After his playing career, he worked as a lawyer and later as a judge in the county court of Split. He was also a long time member of Hajduk's executive board as well as the president of its assembly from 1994 to 1996.

Personal life
His son Ivo Cuzzi was also a footballer.

Honours
Hajduk Split 
 Yugoslav Cup: 1966–67

References

External links
 
 

1940 births
2011 deaths
Footballers from Split, Croatia
Dalmatian Italians
Association football defenders
Yugoslav footballers
Yugoslavia international footballers
HNK Hajduk Split players
FC Lausanne-Sport players
Yugoslav First League players
Swiss Super League players
Yugoslav expatriate footballers
Expatriate footballers in Switzerland
Yugoslav expatriate sportspeople in Switzerland
Burials at Lovrinac Cemetery